Dhuleli is a West Himalayish language of Nepal. It is closely related to Byangsi. Dhuleli has been documented by Regmi & Prasain (2017), who reported 347 speakers as of 2017.

Dhuleli is spoken in the four villages of Dhuli, Jagera, Balaundi, and Niuna in Kanda Gaunpalika, Bajhang District, Nepal.

References

West Himalayish languages
Languages of Sudurpashchim Province